Anthony Ellis is a Welsh-Australian writer and executive best known for his work in television. He was a script assistant and writer during the early years on Home and Away.

He was Channel Nine's Network Script Executive for a number of years.

He helped develop Packed to the Rafters, which he script produced for a number of years.

He is currently Head of Scripted Content for Fremantle Media Australia.

Select credits
Home and Away - writer, script assistant, story editor
Family and Friends (1990) - script editor
The Miraculous Mellops (1991) - writer
The Adventures of Skippy (1992) - writer
Ship to Shore (1994) - writer
Mirror, Mirror (1995) - script editor, story editor, writer
Snowy River: The McGregor Saga (1996) - writer
Water Rats (1996) - writer
Blue Heelers (1996–97) - writer
Big Sky (1997) - writer
All Saints - writer
Always Greener (2001–03) - writer
McLeod's Daughters - writer, story consultant, network script executive
The Eggs (2004) - network script executive
Mortified (2006–07) - network script executive
The Sleepover Club (2006–07) - network script executive
Lockie Leonard (2007) - network script executive
Packed to the Rafters - co-developed by, writer, script producer, script editor

References

External links

Living people
Australian television writers
Year of birth missing (living people)
Australian male television writers